This article details events occurring in the year 2004 in Belgium. Major events include a gas explosion in Ghislenghien, which killed 24 people, and the restructuring of the  Vlaams Blok political party.

Incumbents
Monarch: Albert II
Prime Minister: Guy Verhofstadt

Events
 1 March – Marc Dutroux brought to trial.
 22 March – Marc Dutroux sentenced to life imprisonment.
 24 April – Sporting Anderlecht wins the Belgian First Division 
 30 July – Gas explosion in Ghislenghien, Hainaut, causes 24 deaths.
 21 August – Justine Henin wins the Olympic final against French tennis player Amélie Mauresmo, earning the gold medal
 29 August – Kimi Räikkönen wins the 2004 Belgian Grand Prix at the Circuit de Spa-Francorchamps.
 25 October – Patrick Hoogmartens succeeds Paul Schruers as Bishop of Hasselt
 14 November – Flemish political party Vlaams Blok dissolves and rebrands as Vlaams Belang.
 26 December – 12 Belgians are among the victims of the 2004 Indian Ocean tsunami.

Publications
 Xavier Mabille, Histoire politique de la Belgique: Facteurs et acteurs de changement (Brussels, C.R.I.S.P.).

Art and architecture

Buildings
 Ethias Arena opens in Hasselt
 North Galaxy Towers in Brussels completed (begun 2002)

Births
 6 February – Princess Louise of Belgium
 2 March – Evy Poppe, snowboarder
 13 October – Ben Mertens, snooker player

Deaths

January
 1 January – Jean-Pierre Hallet, anthropologist and human rights activist.
 7 January – Leonce-Albert Van Peteghem, bishop
 28 January – André Van Lysebeth, yoga instructor

February
 2 February – Arthur Gilson, politician
 7 February – Leopold Maertens 
 9 February – Mechtilde van Mechelen, actress
 11 February – Ugo Prinsen, actor
 13 February – Jan De Laender, psychologist and journalist
 21 February – John Taylor, politician

March
 13 March – Roger Nols, mayor
 14 March – Petrus Weemaels, composer
 17 March – Jan Van Der Auwera, soccer player

April
 2 April – Guillaume Marie van Zuylen, bishop
 4 April – Briek Schotte, cyclist
 5 April – Fernand Goyvaerts, soccer player

May
 3 May – Marc Mortier, entrepreneur
 5 May – Marc Scheers, TV producer
 16 May – Omer Grawet, journalist and news reporter
 18 May – Rik Hamblok, abstract painter
 26 May – Frans Buyens, film and TV-director

June
 7 June – Karel Biddeloo comic book creator
 15 June 
 Maurits Sabbe, priest and theologian
 Denise Zimmerman, actress
 20 June – Stive Vermaut, cyclist

July
 3 July – Freddy de Vree, poet 
 8 July – Emile Brichard, cyclist
 27 July – Léon Hurez, politician

August
 2 August – François Craenhals, comic book writer
 10 August – Remi Piryns

September
 5 September – Cecil de Strycker, economist and banker
 9 September – Hein Beniest, film director
 16 September – Cyrillus-Camillus Barbary, First World War veteran
 26 September – Tim Pauwels, cyclist
 30 September – Fernand Terby conductor

See also
 2004 in Belgian television

References

 
2000s in Belgium
Belgium
Years of the 21st century in Belgium
Belgium